Salah Mohsen Mohamed Shalaby (born 1 September 1998) is an Egyptian professional footballer who plays as a forward for the Egypt national team and the Egyptian Premier League side Ceramica Cleopatra on loan from Al Ahly.

Career statistics 
Last updated on June 1, 2021

 With clubs 

International goalsScores and results list Egypt's goal tally first.''

Honours

Club
Al Ahly
 Egyptian Premier League:2017–18, 2018–19, 2019-20
 Egypt Cup: 2019–20
 Egyptian Super Cup: 2018
 CAF Champions League: 2019-20, 2020-21
 FIFA Club World Cup: Third-Place 2020
 CAF Super Cup: 2021

Egypt U23
Africa U-23 Cup of Nations Champions: 2019

References

External links

1998 births
Living people
ENPPI SC players
Al Ahly SC players
Smouha SC players
Egypt international footballers
Egyptian footballers
Association football forwards
Egyptian Premier League players
Footballers at the 2020 Summer Olympics
Olympic footballers of Egypt
People from Zagazig